Hikkaduwe Sri Sumangala Thera (20 January 1827 – 29 April 1911) was a Sri Lankan Buddhist monk, who was one of the pioneers of Sri Lankan Buddhist revivalist movement in the 19th century. He did a great service to improve the Buddhist Education in the country and was the founder of Vidyodaya Pirivena, Maligakanda in 1873 which was granted the university status later in 1959 by the Government of Sri Lanka. A veteran author and a fiery orator, he was a major figure in the Panadurawadaya, a religious debate held between Christian missionaries and Buddhist monks in 1873 at Panadura, Sri Lanka. He was well versed in Sinhala, Pali, Sanskrit, English, Buddhism, History, Arithmetic, and Archaeology and was one of the primary sources of information on Buddhism for the success of the Panadura debate.

Biography
The birth name of Hikkaduwe Sri Sumangala Thera was Don Niculus Gunawardhana. He was born on 20 January 1827 to the family of Don Johannes Abeyweera Gunawardhana Maha Liyana Arachchi Ralahamy and his wife Dandangoda Gamage Christina Hamine of Hettigoda, Hikkaduwa in Galle District. He was the 5th in his family and was baptized according with the general practice prevailed at the time. Young Niculus received his primary education in Sinhala and Pali from the village temple, Hettigoda Thilakarama temple, Hikkaduwa under the tutelage of Ven. Hikkaduwe Sobitha Nayaka Thera and Ven. Mabotuwana Revata Nayaka Thera.

According to astrological predictions on young Niculus's horoscope, his parents decided to ordain him in the order of Buddhist monks as a 'samanera'. Thus  at the age of 9 he was ordained under Arungamuwe Rewatha Thero of Thotagamuwa Raja Maha Vihara at Hikkaduwa and was given the Dharma name of "Hikkaduwe Sumangala". From his childhood he was an eloquent speaker and a very good writer. After four years since becoming a monk he received further education from monk Ven. Pannamgoda Jethuthara Thera and Ven. Bowala Dhammananda Thera. He acquired proficiency in English from John Coranelis Abayawardana, a renowned English scholar in the area. In 1844 the responsibility of Samanera Sumangala was transfered to Rev. Walane Sri Siddartha thero. From then onward he was positioned at the renowned Parama Dhamma Chethiya monastery in Rathmalana. He was not satisfied with just the knowledge he received from the monastery, he proceeded to learn Sanskrit, and subjects such as logic from a Brahmin named Kashinatha.

In 1848 he obtained higher ordination of Upasampada from the Malwatte Chapter, Kandy. Hikkaduwe Sri Sumangala Thera received his higher education from Parama Dhamma Chetiya Pirivena in Ratmalana, under the guidance of Walane Sri Siddhartha Mahathera. Ratmalane Sri Dharmaloka Thera was one of his contemporaries at Parama Dhamma Chetiya Pirivena. After gaining the higher ordination of Upasampada he dedicated his life for the betterment of the world. He provided his services as a teacher at Parama Dhamma Chethiya Pirivena, Hikkaduwe Thilakaramaya, Bogahawatte Sudarshana Paramananda Viharaya, Kotahene Paramananda Viharaya. In 1872, in accordance to an invitation made by the Kotahena Paramananda Viharaya, he came to Colombo

In 1864 he was appointed as the Chief priest of the Sripada (Adam's peak), the holy mountain of Sri Lanka. With this appointment he was unanimously recognized as the foremost Buddhist monk in the whole island. Hikkaduwe Sri Sumangala thera was well versed in Sinhala, Pali, Sanskrit and English languages and also had a very good knowledge in Buddhism, History, Arithmetic and Archaeology. He wrote many books in these subjects and was a leading figure of the Panadura debate (Panadurawadaya) held in 1873. It was after reading a report of this debate that Colonel Henry Steele Olcott visited Sri Lanka. Colonel Olcott learnt Buddhism and Pali under Hikkaduwe Sri Sumangala Thera, who guided him to establish many Buddhist schools in Sri Lanka, such as Ananda College, Colombo (1886), Mahinda College, Galle (1892) and Dharmaraja College, Kandy (1887). It was also in the presence of Hikkaduwe Sri Sumangala Thera, C. W. Leadbeater, an influential member of the Theosophical Society repeated the Three Refuges and the Five Precepts of Buddhism and became a Buddhist.

In 1885 with the donation of a land area in Hunupitiya Colombo by, H.L.De Mel, a non Buddhist, he was able to establish the Gangarama Temple. He also took measures to bring down a part of the Sri maha bodhi from Anuradhapura and Plant it amidst the Gangarama Temple premises for worship. He was the chief monk of the Gangarama Temple and upon his demise he was succeeded by Rev. Devundara Sri Jinarathana Thero. 

Hikkaduwe Sri Sumangala Thera was the chairman of the 'Colombo Committee' which originally designed the Buddhist flag in 1885. Sri Sumangala thera was also a pioneer in Buddhist news paper journalism in Sri Lanka. The paper "Lankaloka" was started by him and afterwards he assisted the local Buddhist community to publish papers such as "Sarasavisandaresa" and "Sinhala Bauddhaya". He was well honored an awarded many titles by Sri Lankans as well as the people of many other countries in the East and the West. Reputed and renowned institutions in Ireland, Italy, Hungary and Germany also bestowed felicitation degrees on him. After rendering a yeoman service to the Buddhasasana, Hikkaduwe Sri Sumangala Thera died on 29 April 1911, at the age of 84.

Positions held 

 Chief monk of the Sri Pāda 
 Chief priest of Southern Sri Lanka
 Chief priest of Colombo Nawa Koralaya
 Adviser of the Buddhist Theosophical Society
 Adviser of the Mahabodhi Society

Literary works

 Brahma Dharmaya 
 Warna Reethi (1873)
 Masarthu Lakshana (1858)
 Translation of Mahavamsa to Sinhalese (1847)
 Sidath Sangara Sannasa
 Kavya Shekhara Sannasa
 Balawatharatikawa
 Pali Namapada Malawa
Kristhiyani Waada Wibhaathaniya
Sathya Margaya
Rivirasa
Bhuddha Addahilla

See also
 Buddhist flag
 Gangaramaya Temple
 Migettuwatte Gunananda Thera
 Ratmalane Sri Dharmaloka Thera
 Seema Malaka
 Weligama Sri Sumangala Thera
 Yagirala Pannananda

References

1827 births
1911 deaths
Theravada Buddhist monks
Sri Lankan Theravada Buddhists
Sri Lankan Buddhist monks
People from British Ceylon
National Heroes of Sri Lanka
Buddhist revivalists
Sinhalese monks